Events from the year 1554 in art.

Events
Gerlach Flicke, temporarily imprisoned in London with pirate Henry Strangways, paints a diptych of them both, which constitutes the earliest known self-portrait in oils in England.
A group of Edinburgh painters, led by one Walter Binning, assault an outsider, David Warkman, who has been painting a ceiling in the city.

Works

Paintings
 Hans Eworth – Queen Mary Tudor
 Gerlach Flicke – Self-portrait with Henry Strangwish
 Antonis Mor – Queen Mary Tudor
 Titian – Danae and Christ Appearing to his Mother after his Resurrection

Sculptures
 Benvenuto Cellini – Perseus with the Head of Medusa

Births
February 27 - Giovanni Battista Paggi, Italian painter (died 1627)
date unknown
Paul Brill, landscape painter of frescoes who worked in Rome (died 1626)
Cesare Corte, Italian painter active mainly in his natal city of Genoa (died 1613)
Augustin Cranach, German painter, son of Lucas Cranach the Younger (died 1595)
Costantini de' Servi, Italian painter (died 1622)
Mir Emad Hassani, Persian Nastaʿlīq script calligrapher (died 1615)
Rombertus van Uylenburgh, father-in-law of Rembrandt (died 1624)
probable - William Segar, court painter to Queen Elizabeth I of England (died 1633)

Deaths
April - Simone Mosca, Italian sculptor (born 1492)
December 22 - Moretto da Brescia, Italian Renaissance painter of Brescia and Venice (born 1498)
date unknown
Giovanni Francesco Rustici, Italian Renaissance painter and sculptor (born 1474)
Anthony Toto, Italian painter and architect (born 1498)
probable
Michelangelo Anselmi, Italian Renaissance-Mannerist painter active mostly in Parma (born 1492)
Hans Brosamer, German engraver, wood-cutter, and portraitist (born 1506)

References

 
Years of the 16th century in art